Coomaniella is a genus of beetles in the family Buprestidae, containing the following species:

 Coomaniella abeillei Obenberger, 1940
 Coomaniella bicolor Jendek & Kalashian, 1999
 Coomaniella biformis Bily & Kalashian, 1994
 Coomaniella biformissima Jendek & Kalashian, 1999
 Coomaniella chinensis Jendek & Kalashian, 1999
 Coomaniella daoensis Jendek & Kalashian, 1999
 Coomaniella isolata Jendek & Kalashian, 1999
 Coomaniella janka Jendek, 2005
 Coomaniella jeanvoinei Thery, 1929
 Coomaniella kubani Bily & Kalashian, 1994
 Coomaniella lao Jendek & Kalashian, 1999
 Coomaniella macropus Thery, 1929
 Coomaniella marguieri Baudon, 1967
 Coomaniella marseuli Obenberger, 1940
 Coomaniella modesta Bourgoin, 1924
 Coomaniella nativa Jendek & Kalashian, 1999
 Coomaniella orlovi Jendek & Kalashian, 1999
 Coomaniella pacholatkoi Jendek & Kalashian, 1999
 Coomaniella prolonga Jendek & Kalashian, 1999
 Coomaniella purpurascens Baudon, 1966
 Coomaniella sausa Jendek & Kalashian, 1999
 Coomaniella siniaevi Jendek & Kalashian, 1999
 Coomaniella taiwanensis Baudon, 1966
 Coomaniella violaceipennis Bourgoin, 1924

References

Buprestidae genera